Geothermal power in El Salvador represents 25% of the country's total electricity production. El Salvador is one of the top ten geothermal energy producers in the world. Since 1975, the Ahuachapán geothermal field has been in continuous and successful commercial operation. Since 1992, the Berlin geothermal field is under commercial production, with the installation of two units. Each one with 5 MWe power plants.

See also

 Electricity sector in El Salvador
Renewable energy by country

References

Geothermal energy in El Salvador